KNFA (90.7 FM) is a radio station broadcasting a Religious music format. Licensed to Grand Island, Nebraska, United States, the station is currently owned by Family Worship Center Church.

References

External links
http://sonlifetv.com

NFA